An insulin port functions as a medication delivery channel directly into the subcutaneous tissue (the tissue layer located just beneath the skin). When applying the injection port, an insertion needle guides a soft cannula (a small, flexible tube) under the skin. Once applied, the insertion needle is removed and only the soft cannula remains below the skin, acting as the gateway into the subcutaneous tissue.

To inject through an insulin port the needle of a syringe or insulin pen is used. It is usually used to deliver insulin through the use of an insulin pump. The needle remains above the surface of the skin, while the medication is immediately delivered through the soft cannula and into the subcutaneous tissue.

See also
 Injection port

References

Catheters
Diabetes-related supplies and medical equipment
Insulin therapies